(e) or Quebecois(e) may refer to:

 Related to the Canadian province of Quebec
 most often, Québécois people, a native or inhabitant of Quebec
 any native or resident of Quebec, see Demographics of Quebec
 the French culture of Quebec
 Quebec French, the variety of French spoken in Quebec
 A native or inhabitant of the province's capital, Quebec City (rare in English)
 Le Québécois, a newspaper based in Quebec City
 Algoma Quebecois, a freighter launched in 1963
 Groupe La Québécoise, a passenger transport company

See also
 French Canadian
 Quebecer (disambiguation)
 Quebec (disambiguation)

Language and nationality disambiguation pages